Locust Grove, also known as Beech Neck, is a historic home located at La Plata, Charles County, Maryland, United States. It is a two-story, three bay Federal style frame house, with a fine view of the Port Tobacco Valley. The original section of the house was built prior to 1750, with a significant expansion occurring about 1825.

Locust Grove was listed on the National Register of Historic Places in 1998.

References

External links
, including undated photo, at Maryland Historical Trust

Houses in Charles County, Maryland
Houses on the National Register of Historic Places in Maryland
Federal architecture in Maryland
Historic American Buildings Survey in Maryland
National Register of Historic Places in Charles County, Maryland